Igor Pedan is a -born Russian strongman who is best known for competing in the IFSA Strongman World Championships and World's Strongest Man. Igor was born in Ukraine, currently he resides in Moscow, and competes for Russia. He won the title Russia's Strongest Man in 2004, and won the 3rd competition of the United Strongman Series in Moscow in 2005.

References

Russian strength athletes
Russian male weightlifters
Living people
Ukrainian emigrants to Russia
Year of birth missing (living people)